The General Dan Pienaar Artillery Regiment (formerly the Vrystaatse Artillerie Regiment) is a reserve artillery regiment of the South African Army.

History

Origin

The First Regiment
In 1854 the Free-State became an independent Republic. The British forces withdrew, leaving behind four 9-pounder garrison guns in the Queen's Fort in Bloemfontein. This was for many years the only ordnance the Free State Republic had.

The Free State Artillery Corps was subsequently founded in 1864 on a request by President Johannes Henricus Brand and housed in Queen's Fort.

Anglo Boer War
By the outbreak of the Anglo-Boer War, the corps was commanded by Major Richard Friedrich Wilhelm Albrecht. The unit (in 1898 some 160 men, 24 cannons of various calibers) served on the Western front, Natal front and into the Guerrilla phase of the War. The unit played a major role in every major battle of the war where Free State forces fought.

The Second Regiment
In 1922, 3 Permanent Battery was formed. This unit was split up on 1 July 1926 into two units namely 4 Burgher Battery and 5 Burgher Battery.

In 1932 these two were renamed 1 Oranje-Vrystaat Veldartillerie and 2 Oranje Vrystaat Veldartillerie.

World War 2
On 1 February 1940 these units were joined as 12th Field Battery and saw service in Egypt. They took heavy casualties at Tobruk and El-Alamein.

On 18 April 1946 the unit was renamed 6 Field Artillery Regiment.

Post WW 2
Vrystaatse Artillerie Regiment was based at Tempe, Bloemfontein, but relocated to Kroonstad in 2007. The relocation coincided with the revitalization of the unit through the joining of Army Territorial Reserve members with the closing of the Commandos.

Name Change
In August 2019, 52 Reserve Force units had their names changed to reflect the diverse military history of South Africa. The Vrystaatse Artillerie Regiment became the General Dan Pienaar Artillery Regiment, and have 3 years to design and implement new regimental insignia.

The current honorific is a remembrance of Major General Dan Pienaar, who served in both World Wars and was more known as commander of the 1st South African Infantry Division, which served the Allied forces and was part of the victorious forces that took part in the Second Battle of El Alamein (October 1942).

Battle honours
 Anglo-Boer War 1899-1902
 Tobruk
 El-Alamein
 South-West Africa

Officers Commanding

1991-1997 Lt Col Paul H. Fick
1986-1991 Cmdt Danie Acker
1984-1986 Cmdt Gerhard Groenewoud
1979-1984 Cmdt Chris Biel
1974-1978 Cmdt BC Stevens
2007 - 2009 Lt Col Botha
2009 - 2014 Maj Smart
2014 - 2019 Maj Scheurkogel

RSM 
2007–Present MWO H.Beyers

Freedom of the city 
Bloemfontein

2012 Ladysmith

Insignia

References

Bibliography
 Ultima Ratio Regum; the Artillery History of South-Africa, South-African Army Information Bureau 1987
 Swemmer D, Die Geskiedenis van die Vrystaatse Artillerie, Unpublished Manuscript, 1946
 Barnard,S.L.(ed) van der Westhuizen,G.  Smit, L. Vrystaatse Artillerie: Die Geskiedenis van 6 Veldregiment

Artillery regiments of South Africa
Military units and formations established in 1854
1854 establishments in South Africa